Villains is a crime drama series, shown in the UK in 1972, following the linked fates of nine bank robbers, led by George (David Daker). It begins with the nine men meeting in prison during their appeal and traces each individual after the group escape from custody. The series also starred William Marlowe, Bob Hoskins and Martin Shaw.

DVD release

The complete series was released on DVD by Network DVD in August 2012.

References

External links

1972 British television series debuts
1972 British television series endings
1970s British drama television series
ITV television dramas
1970s British crime television series
1970s British television miniseries
Television series by ITV Studios
London Weekend Television shows
English-language television shows
Television shows set in London